Lashidan may refer to:
 Lashidan-e Hokumati
 Lashidan-e Motlaq